Muhammad Sadiq may refer to:

 Muhammad Sadiq (photographer) (born 1822 or 1832), Egyptian military surveyor and first person to photograph the holiest sites of Islam
 Mohammed Sadiq (actor), Indian actor, known by the mononym Sadiq
 Muhammad Sadiq (boxer) (born 1934), Pakistani Olympic boxer
 Muhammad Sadiq (painter), 18th-century Persian painter
 Muhammad Sadiq (singer) (born 1942), Indian singer, actor and politician
 Muhammad Sadiq (athlete) (born 1938), Pakistani Olympic sprinter
Mohammad Sadiq (bureaucrat), former chairperson of Bangladesh Public Service Commission.
 Sheikh Muhammad Sadiq, Pakistani lyricist and poet
 Choudry Mohammad Sadiq (1900-1975), Pakistani lawyer and politician
 Muhammad Sadiq Ardestani (died 1721), Iranian Shia philosopher
 Mufti Muhammad Sadiq (1872-?), American Muslim missionary

See also 
 Muhammed Sadiq, Indian actor
 Mohammed Sadiq (disambiguation)